Jack Ryan McGlynn (born July 7, 2003) is an American professional soccer player who plays as a midfielder for Major League Soccer club Philadelphia Union.

Club career
Born in Middle Village, New York, McGlynn started his career with BW Gottschee Academy, a prominent soccer academy in New York City. In 2019, McGlynn moved to Philadelphia and joined the youth academy at the Philadelphia Union. During the 2019–20 academy season, McGlynn scored seven goals and on March 6, 2020, he signed a professional contract with the Union's reserve affiliate, Philadelphia Union II for the 2020 season.

On March 7, 2020, a day after signing with Union II, McGlynn made his competitive debut for the side in the USL Championship against Loudoun United. He came on as an 82nd-minute substitute for Luis Flores as Union II drew 0–0. On August 5, McGlynn scored his first professional goal against New York Red Bulls II. His first-half stoppage time goal was the equalizer in a 3–2 victory for the Union II. McGlynn finished the season for Philadelphia Union II with five goals in fourteen matches.

Philadelphia Union
On August 20, 2020, McGlynn signed a pre-homegrown player deal with the Philadelphia Union, joining the club for the 2021 season. He made his debut for the Union on April 14, 2021, in a 4–0 victory over Deportivo Saprissa in the CONCACAF Champions League, coming on as a 68th-minute substitute for Leon Flach. McGlynn's debut in Major League Soccer came on April 24 against Inter Miami, coming on as a late substitute for Ilsinho.

International career
McGlynn made his international debut for the United States at the under-16 level, playing against the Netherlands on November 14, 2019. Jack is also eligible to represent Ireland due to dual citizenship through his Irish born father, and he has been approached by the Football Association of Ireland to do so if he chooses.

Personal life
McGlynn is the younger brother of Conor McGlynn, who is also a professional soccer player for USL Championship club Hartford Athletic. On July 25, 2020, both Jack and Conor played against each other for Philadelphia Union II and Hartford Athletic respectively in the USL Championship. They played against each other again on September 23, in which Jack scored the equalizer for Union II in a 1–1 draw.

Career statistics

Club

Honors
United States U20
CONCACAF U-20 Championship: 2022

References

External links
 Profile at Philadelphia Union

2003 births
Living people
Sportspeople from Queens, New York
Soccer players from New York City
American soccer players
American people of Irish descent
Association football midfielders
People from Middle Village, Queens
Philadelphia Union II players
Philadelphia Union players
USL Championship players
Major League Soccer players
Homegrown Players (MLS)
United States men's youth international soccer players
United States men's under-20 international soccer players